Bukovite is a rare selenide mineral with formula Tl2Cu3FeSe4. It is a brown to black metallic mineral which crystallizes in the tetragonal system.

It was first described in 1971 for an occurrence in the Bukov uranium mine, Rožná deposit, Vysočina Region, Moravia, Czech Republic. It has also been reported in Skrikerum, near Tryserum, Kalmar, Sweden; near Vernet-la-Varenne, Puy-de-Dôme, France; and Tuminico, Sierra de Cacho, La Rioja Province, Argentina.

See also
Beraunite

References 

Selenide minerals
Thallium minerals
Copper minerals
Iron minerals
Tetragonal minerals
Minerals in space group 139